Bau is a gold mining town, capital of Bau district in the Kuching Division of Sarawak, Malaysia.

History

On 1 May 1837, the Skrang Ibans invaded the Jagoi-Bratak Bidayuh settlement on top of Bratak Peak, killing over 2,000 Jagoi-Bratak Bidayuh men and taking 1,000 women captive. Panglima Kulow, head of Jagoi-Bratak Bidayuh community, and a handful of his followers survived the massacre. In 1841 James Brooke, who was then the newly installed White Rajah of Sarawak, was able to rescue some of the women taken captive. Each year on 1 May, descendants of the survivors of the 1837 massacre hold Jagoi-Bratak Day on top of Bratak Peak in Bau in memory of their ancestors. A memorial stone was erected on 1 May 1988, to mark the day.

Gold mining

The gold deposits in Bau Township occur in the Jugan Hills in marine sedimentary rocks of late Jurassic to early Cretaceous age, primarily limestone.  The gold comes from hydrothermal sources activated by local volcanism. The gold is found in four distinct configurations: disseminated throughout the mineralized sediments; as silica replacement; in breccias having magno-calcite quartz veining; and occasionally as porphyritic skarns.

Gold began being mined in Bau in the 1840s. It was discovered by Chinese miners from Pangkalan Tebang. After the Chinese uprising by Liu Shan Bang in 1857, the mining operations were gradually taken over by The Borneo Company with the last Chinese syndicate being bought out in 1884. In 1898, The Borneo Company introduced the cyanide process for extracting the gold, which led to increased environmental pollution. The mines were closed in 1921 because most of the minerals, easily reachable by existing techniques, had been removed. But during the Great Depression Chinese miners continued to artisanally mine the deposits. The mines were reopened in the late 1970s when world gold prices soared, but were closed down again in 1996 when the Asian financial crisis started.  The last mining occurred at the Tai Parit open-pit mine.

In 2002, Preston Resources began exploratory development of the mining leases formerly held by Malaysia's Oriental Peninsula Gold (now Peninsula Gold Ltd.).  In 2006, Zedex Minerals purchased a controlling interest in the exploratory leases. Zedex was primarily concerned with determining the extent and richness of the remaining Jugan gold deposits, but it also assayed the old tailings at the Bukit Young Gold Mine site for potential reprocessing. In 2009 Zedex was merged into Olympus Pacific Minerals. As of 2014, the mining rights were held by North Borneo Gold, a joint venture of Besra Gold (aka Olympus Pacific Minerals), Golden Celesta and Gladioli Enterprises, a Malaysian mining group.  , the mines have not reopened.

Ecology
The limestone cliffs in the area support a wide range of endemic flora, including the rare pitcher plant Nepenthes northiana.

Schools

Primary school
SK Tringgus
SK Tembawang
SK Sungai Pinang
SK Suba Buan
SK Stass
SK St Teresa (M)
SK St Stephen (M)
SK St Patrick (M)
SK St John (M)
SK Skibang
SK Siniawan
SK Simpang Kuda
SK Serumbu
SK Serasot
SK Serabak
SK Senibong
SK Segubang
SK Segong
SK Sebobok
SK Puak
SK Podam
SK Pedaun Bawah
SK Opar
SK Kampung Bobak/Sejinjang
SK Jagoi
SK Gumbang
SK Grogo
SK Buso
SK Bau
SK Atas
SK Apar
SJK (C) Chung Hua Tondong
SJK (C) Chung Hua Taiton
SJK (C) Chung Hua Siniawan
SJK (C) Chung Hua Sebuku
SJK (C) Chung Hua Paku
SJK (C) Chung Hua Musi
SJK (C) Chung Hua Kranji
SJK (C) Chung Hua Buso
SJK (C) Chung Hua Bau

Secondary schools
SMK Paku (S)
SMK Lake
SMK Bau
SMK Singai (open on 25 June 2018 as the 4th secondary school in Bau District)

Transportation

Local Bus

Attractions and recreational spots
In 2022, Roxy Tasik Biru Resort City was opened to public. It is equipped with a floating bridge, fountain, chalets, a café, and a boat ride service.

Notable people from Bau
Pandelela Rinong, 2012 Olympic medallist for diving, 2016 Olympic medallist for diving, Bidayuh girl from Kampung Jugan, Bau.

Notes

Bau District
Towns in Sarawak